Mike L. Kohler is an American politician serving as a member of the Utah House of Representatives from the 54th district. Elected in November 2020, he assumed office on January 1, 2021.

Early life and education 
Kohler was born and raised in Midway, Utah. He studied agricultural economics and dairy science at Utah State University before returning home to his family's farm. Kohler later studied economics at the University of Utah.

Career 
Kohler operated a farm before selling his ownership share to family members. He has since managed the Midway Irrigation Company. He was also a member of the Wasatch County Commission. Kohler was elected to the Utah House of Representatives in November 2020 and assumed office on January 1, 2021.

References

External links

Living people
People from Midway, Utah
People from Wasatch County, Utah
Republican Party members of the Utah House of Representatives
21st-century American politicians
Year of birth missing (living people)